Tire bead is the term for the edge of a tire that sits on the wheel.  Wheels for automobiles, bicycles, etc. are made with a small slot or groove into which the tire bead sits.  When the tire is properly inflated, the air pressure within the tire keeps the bead in this groove.

It is common amongst drivers of off-road vehicles to decrease the air pressure in their tires.  This makes the tread of the tire spread out, creating more surface area for the tire's tread to grip the terrain. If the pressure is too low, there may not be enough pressure to keep the bead on the wheel, thus causing the bead to pop off the wheel; this is often referred to as "losing a bead". Beadlocks, which clamp the bead on the wheel, are often used in this case.

Often, the bead can become frozen to the rim after rusting occurs, requiring the use of a bead breaker.

References 

Tires